Margaret Clark Gillett (1878–1962) was a British botanist and social reformer who is noted for advocating for women and children held in concentration camps following the Boer War.  In February 1909 she married banker Arthur Bevington Gillett (1875–1954).

References

1878 births
1962 deaths
Women botanists
Boer Wars
British suffragists
British women scientists